Markiana is a genus of characins from tropical South America.

Species
There are currently 2 recognized species in this genus:
 Markiana geayi (Pellegrin, 1909)
 Markiana nigripinnis (Perugia, 1891)

References

Characidae
Taxa named by Carl H. Eigenmann
Fish of South America